After Five in the Forest Primeval, sometimes also known as It's a Jungle Out There, is a 1995 German romantic comedy film directed by Hans-Christian Schmid and starring Franka Potente in her first film role. The film tells the story of a 17-year-old girl Anna who, in search of freedom in an urban environment, runs away from home with a boy who has a crush on her. Her parents launch into a search for Anna and, during the process, reminisce about their own search for freedom in their youth.

The film was intended to be a television film and had a screening in October 1995 at the Hof International Film Festival where Hans-Christian Schmid was awarded the Best New Director Promotional Award (also known as Eastman Support Prize for Up-and-Coming Talent). During the festival, the German distributing company Senator Film picked up the film for theatrical distribution and the film opened in German theaters on April 25, 1996. At the 1996 Bavarian Film Awards, Franka Potente won the award for Best Young Actress. The film was also nominated for accolades at the 1997 Bavarian Film Awards where it won the award for Best Production.

Cast
 Franka Potente as Anna
 Axel Milberg as Wolfgang
 Dagmar Manzel as Karin
 Farina Brock as Clara
 Sibylle Canonica as Johanna
 Peter Ender as Oliver
 Max Urlacher as Ben
 Thomas Schmauser as Simon
 Johann von Bülow as Nick
 Julia Thurnau as Mick's friend

See also
 1995 in film
 List of German films of the 1990s

References

External links
 

1996 films
1996 romantic comedy films
German romantic comedy films
German coming-of-age comedy films
1990s German-language films
Films directed by Hans-Christian Schmid
1990s coming-of-age comedy films
1990s German films